Granaria is a genus of air-breathing land snail, a terrestrial pulmonate gastropod mollusc in the subfamily Granariinae of the family Chondrinidae.

Species
Species within the genus Granaria include:

 Granaria arabica (Dohrn, 1860)
 † Granaria costata (Lueger, 1981) 
 Granaria crassiventer Salvador, Höltke, Rasser & Kadolsky, 2016 †
 Granaria frumentum (Draparnaud, 1801) 
 † Granaria fustis (O. Boettger, 1889) 
 † Granaria grossecostata (Gottschick & Wenz, 1919) 
 † Granaria helicidarum (Jooss, 1924) 
 † Granaria intrusa (Slavík, 1869) 
 Granaria lapidaria (Hutton, 1849)
 † Granaria moedlingensis Harzhauser & H. Binder, 2004 
 † Granaria multicostulata (Gutzwiller, 1905) 
 † Granaria oryza (F. E. Edwards, 1852) 
 Granaria persica Gittenberger, 1973
 † Granaria schlosseri (Cossmann, 1908) 
 † Granaria schuebleri (Klein, 1846) 
 Granaria stabilei (Martens, 1865)
 † Granaria subvariabilis (Sandberger, 1858) 
 Granaria variabilis (Draparnaud, 1801)
Species brought into synonymy
 Granaria antiqua (Zieten, 1832) † : synonym of Granaria schuebleri (Klein, 1846) † (junior homonym of Pupa antiqua Matheron, 1832)
 Granaria braunii (Rossmässler, 1842): synonym of Graniberia braunii (Rossmässler, 1842) (superseded generic combination)
 Granaria illyrica (Rossmässler, 1835): synonym of Granaria frumentum illyrica (Rossmässler, 1835) (unaccepted rank)
 Granaria pachygastra K. Miller, 1900 † : synonym of Granaria crassiventer Salvador, Höltke, Rasser & Kadolsky, 2016 †

References

Chondrinidae